Pinhalzinho may refer to the following places in Brazil:

 Pinhalzinho, Santa Catarina
 Pinhalzinho, São Paulo